Charles "Charlie" Breslin (5 September 1964 – 23 February 1985) was a volunteer in the West Tyrone Brigade of the Provisional Irish Republican Army  from Strabane, County Tyrone, Northern Ireland.

Background
Breslin was from the "Head of the Town" area in Strabane, close to the Irish border with Lifford, County Donegal. Breslin joined Na Fianna Éireann, an Irish republican Scouting movement, at the age of 15.

Paramilitary activities
On 23 February 1985, Breslin, Michael Devine (22) and David Devine (16), all volunteers in the Provisional Irish Republican Army, were shot dead by undercover Special Air Service soldiers, while returning arms to a dump in a field off Plumbridge Road, Strabane.
The undercover soldiers were aware of the arms dump after being tipped off by an informer. Over 200 shots were fired at the trio and Breslin was hit 13 times.

Shoot-to-kill policy
There were claims that the deaths were part of a wider British government "shoot-to-kill" policy in which republican paramilitaries were summarily executed without any attempt at arrest.

The families of the three IRA members that were killed claimed they were ambushed after a stake out by the SAS. In February 1987, a pathologist at the inquest stated two of the victims had been shot 28 times, mostly while on the ground, and that the third victim had been hit on the bridge of the nose. All three had single bullet wounds to the head.

Damages from the Ministry of Defence
An undisclosed amount of compensation was awarded to the families of the three IRA volunteers by the Ministry of Defence on 7 May 2002, as part of a Belfast High Court settlement brought as a result of the shootings.

Memorial attacked
In February 2005, in excess of a thousand people went to the graveside of Charles Breslin and the Devine brothers to mark the 20th anniversary of the shooting and hear an oration given by Gerry Adams. Members of the Police Service of Northern Ireland were accused of desecrating the graves of the volunteers, although Superintendent Raymond Murray of the PSNI denied that they had any involvement.

See also
Shoot-to-kill policy in Northern Ireland
Diarmuid O'Neill
Aidan McAnespie

References

1964 births
1985 deaths
Deaths by firearm in Northern Ireland
Irish republicans
People from Strabane
People killed by security forces during The Troubles (Northern Ireland)
People killed in United Kingdom intelligence operations
Provisional Irish Republican Army members